Alveopora is a genus of colonial stony corals in the family Acroporidae. Members of this genus are native to the Indo-Pacific region and are often found on reef slopes in turbid water. They are generally uncommon.

Characteristics
Alveopora has a very light and porous skeleton consisting of interconnecting rods and spines. The colonies are either massive or branching and often have irregular shapes. The corallites have walls that are very perforated and septa that are mostly composed of fine spines which may meet in the centre forming a tangle of columella. The polyps are large and fleshy and are normally extended both day and night. They have twelve tentacles, often with swollen knob-like tips. They have symbiotic zooxanthellae in their tissues and are usually white, pale grey, cream or light brown, sometimes with contrasting coloured tentacles.

Species
This genus contains the following species:

Alveopora allingi Hoffmeister, 1925
Alveopora catalai Wells, 1968
Alveopora daedalea (Forsskål, 1775)
Alveopora excelsa Verrill, 1864
Alveopora fenestrata (Lamarck, 1816)
Alveopora gigas Veron, 1985
Alveopora japonica Eguchi, 1968
Alveopora marionensis Veron & Pichon, 1982
Alveopora minuta Veron, 2000
Alveopora noamiae  Nemenzo, 1979
Alveopora ocellata Wells, 1954
Alveopora simplex
Alveopora spongiosa Dana, 1846
Alveopora superficialis Pillai & Scheer, 1976
Alveopora tizardi Bassett-Smith, 1890
Alveopora verrilliana Dana, 1846
Alveopora viridis (Quoy & Gaimard, 1833)

References

Acroporidae
Scleractinia genera
Taxa named by Henri Marie Ducrotay de Blainville